Xerocrassa arturi is a species of air-breathing land snail, a pulmonate gastropod mollusk in the family Geomitridae.

Distribution

This species is endemic to Spain, where it occurs in the mountains near the lower section of the Ebro river.

References

 Bank, R. A.; Neubert, E. (2017). Checklist of the land and freshwater Gastropoda of Europe. Last update: July 16th, 2017

External links
 Haas, F. (1924). Beitrag zur Molluskenfauna des unteren Ebrogebietes. Archiv für Molluskenkunde. 56 (4): 137-160, pl. 8. Frankfurt am Main.

arturi
Molluscs of Europe
Endemic fauna of Spain
Gastropods described in 1924